Charles Robert Simpson (born 7 June 1985) is an English singer, songwriter and musician from Ipswich. He is a member of the rock band Busted and he is also the lead vocalist and the rhythm guitarist in the British post-hardcore band Fightstar. AllMusic has noted that Simpson is "perhaps the only pop star to make the convincing transition from fresh-faced boy bander to authentic hard rock frontman". Simpson is a multi-instrumentalist, playing guitar, bass, keyboard, piano and drums.

Simpson has achieved ten UK Albums Chart top 40 releases across his musical career, five of which entered into the UK top 10. He has also had four number one singles with Busted and two top 20 singles with Fightstar. Between Busted, Fightstar and his solo projects, he has sold over five million records worldwide, winning two Brit Awards and being nominated for two Kerrang! Awards. In 2015, Simpson also released an EP with a side project called Once Upon a Dead Man alongside his two brothers Will and Edd Simpson, and friend Simon Britcliff. On 10 November 2015, Busted announced they would be reforming with Simpson back in the original line-up and would embark on an 18 date arena tour around the UK and Ireland. The band sold 100,000 tickets in the first hour of the tour going on sale. Busted's third studio album Night Driver was released in November 2016. In 2018, Busted announced their fourth album Half Way There, along with arena tour dates in March 2019. The album was released on 1 February 2019 and reached number 2 in the UK.

Early life and family
The youngest of three boys, Simpson was born in Ipswich, Suffolk. He has 2 brothers, Will and Edd;— Will was born in 1980 and is the vocalist and guitarist in Brigade and Edd was born in 1981 and is the lead singer and guitarist in an alternative band called Union Sound Set. Simpson has a very musical family dating back to Sir William Sterndale Bennett (mother's maiden name) who was an English pianist, conductor, and composer, a notable figure in the musical life of his time.

Simpson was educated at Framlingham College's prep school Brandeston Hall –  and then at Uppingham School, where his great grandfather Robert Sterndale Bennett (1880-1963), had been a most influential Director of Music between 1908 and 1945.

Career

Busted (2002–2005; 2015–present)
Simpson first gained fame with pop rock/pop punk act Busted as a result to responding to an advertisement placed by Matt Willis and James Bourne in NME magazine in 2001. Busted consisted of Simpson on lead guitar and occasionally drums, Willis on bass guitar and Bourne on rhythm guitar and piano; all three members provided vocals. Over a period of two years, the trio had major success and sold over 5 million records, won two BRIT Awards, and also won Record of The Year in 2004.

On 10 November 2015, Busted announced they would be reforming after 10 years and would embark on an 18 date UK arena tour, as well as recording a new album. They released their third album Night Driver in 2016 which was then followed by Half Way There in 2019. In the latter end of that year, Busted entered their first hiatus since their comeback so the members could concentrate on other projects.

Fightstar (2003–present)

Despite the huge success of Busted, Simpson began to grow increasingly discontented with the pop star lifestyle and the music he was performing. As an avid fan of rock music, he felt unfulfilled by the commercial pop songs of Busted.

He met Alex Westaway in late 2003, forming what became Fightstar shortly afterwards. For over a year he would lead a secret "double life": by night he would attend rehearsal sessions with his new band after completing obligated media work and concert performances with Busted. During 2004, he and Westaway wrote Fightstar's debut EP, They Liked You Better When You Were Dead. The EP showcased a heavier post-hardcore influenced sound that differed greatly to Busted's material. The EP was recorded during November with Mark Williams in London. During this time, speculation began to grow about Busted's future. He announced he was leaving Busted to pursue his career full-time with Fightstar in January 2005.

Simpson then funded and put together a compilation album called The Suffolk Explosion, which was released through his own label Sandwich Leg Records. It showcased a number of unsigned bands from Charlie's home county of Suffolk, including Brigade and Prego, as well as a solo acoustic track written by him called "Carry Her". Fightstar went on to record their debut full-length studio album with rock producer Colin Richardson. Grand Unification was released on 13 March 2006, and further proved the initial cynics wrong by receiving widespread positive reviews. In particular, Paul Brannigan of Kerrang! magazine stated the album was "one of the best British rock albums of the past decade". Scottish music publication The Fly also lauded the album as "one of the 21st Century's ultimate rock debuts". Shortly afterwards, the band went on to receive nominations at the Kerrang! Awards for "Best British Newcomer" and "Best British Band". After leaving Island Records due to a disagreement over the band's artistic direction, the band signed to an independent label called Institute Records which was a division of Gut Records to release their second album. One Day Son, This Will All Be Yours (2007), peaked at No. 27 on the UK Album Chart, before releasing a B-sides compilation album titled Alternate Endings (2008). The four-piece then funded and co-produced their third album, Be Human (2009), which became their highest charting album after peaking at No. 20 in the UK.

On 29 July 2009, he made a Myspace page for his acoustic solo work. There were three songs on the page, "Dead Man Walking", 'Empty Guns (Demo)', and 'Carry Her'. 'Carry Her' was previously available on The Suffolk Explosion.

Charlie has also been involved in film scoring, stating in an interview that this was something he was keen to pursue later in his career. He wrote the score for an independent British film 'Everyone's Going To Die', which debuted at the SXSW Film Festival in March 2013.

Solo career (2010–present)
Fightstar announced a hiatus at the beginning of 2010, stating that they were "taking some time off" for the remainder of 2010–11 to work on separate projects before regrouping in 2012 to begin working a new record.
Simpson has started working on a solo acoustic album, while Westaway and Haigh will be completing post-production on the bands film and working on some music videos.

Simpson went into the studio in June 2010 to start recording his full-length debut album with producer Danton Supple, whose previous work includes Coldplay and The Cure. The album was funded through PledgeMusic and as one of the main incentives for the campaign, fans received an EP called When We Were Lions on Christmas Day 2010. The full-length album was finally finished in February 2011 and was mastered by John Davis at Metropolis Studios in London. The first single to be taken from the album was called "Down Down Down" and it had its first radio airplay on 11 April, as Radio 1 DJ Fearne Cotton's Record of the Week. The single was officially released on 16 May, though it was made available to buy on iTunes straight away. The album, titled Young Pilgrim was released on 15 August 2011. It went straight into the UK album chart at number 6, having been at number 5 in the midweeks. Simpson signed to PIAS Records in Germany and the album was released in Europe in August 2012.

On 2 February 2013, it was reported that Simpson had finished writing the follow up to his 2011 solo debut 'Young Pilgrim' and he would be heading into the studio with producer Steve Osbourne (U2/Placebo) to start recording in early March.

Simpson spent the summer of 2013 playing on the Vans Warped Tour in the US, which was the first time he has played live as a solo artist in America. During October 2013, Charlie went on a tour of the UK supporting rock band, Deaf Havana. He previewed two new tracks from the forthcoming album "Winter Hymns" and "Ten More Days". In 2014, he undertook a small run of solo shows in the UK in the lead up to the release of his second solo album.

Simpson announced on 28 April 2014 that his second solo album is to be called Long Road Home and will be released later that year, since revealing the release date would be 4 August 2014. He also announced that he will be doing his biggest headline show to date at the London Roundhouse on 14 October.

In October 2014 Simpson announced that he would play a 13 date UK solo acoustic tour in January/February of the following year.

On 5 May 2016, Simpson released his third solo album, Little Hands, a compilation of rare tracks from 2010 though 2016. The first single was a stripped-down version of "Emily". The album also included the track from the Watch UKTV series Singing In the Rainforest, "Walking With the San", which first aired in 2015. The song was recorded as part of the show in which Charlie travelled to Namibia to spend time living and playing music with the San people. After the show aired, an edit was made to act as a music video for the song and was uploaded to Facebook, the track has since gone viral and has been viewed over 14,000,000 times.

On 23 October 2020, Simpson released the first track from his upcoming album I See You, which peaked at 39 on the iTunes chart in its first week. In late 2021, Simpson announced his fourth album Hope Is A Drug would be released in March 2022. He announced a planned Hope Is A Drug tour.
The tour was later postponed citing delays to album supply chains and shipping caused by the Covid-19 pandemic.

Other works

Outside of his main musical activities, Simpson also has frequently collaborated with other musicians, which include This Is Menace, Gunship (the side project of his Fightstar bandmates, Alex Westaway and Dan Haigh) as well as indie band, The Travis Waltons. With Gunship, he co-wrote and lent his voice for their highly critical acclaimed single, "Tech Noir", of Gunship's debut album. In 2018, he contributed to Bullet for My Valentine's sixth album Gravity, receiving a songwriting credit on the track "Breathe Underwater".

In 2023, Simpson won the fourth series of The Masked Singer as "Rhino", making him the first male winner in the UK. After his victory, he released the EP Kifaru containing songs he performed on The Masked Singer.

Personal life

Simpson married his long-time girlfriend Anna Barnard in June 2014, following the announcement of their engagement the week earlier. During a show on his 2015 UK Tour at London's Islington Assembly Hall, Simpson announced that he and his wife were expecting their first child together. On 21 July that year, Simpson's wife gave birth to their first son, Arlo Simpson. In February 2018, their second son, Jago was born.

In 2004, Simpson was quoted in Tatler magazine as saying he supported the Conservative Party, stating that he'd "grown up with their views" and "way of doing things". According to The Guardian, Simpson "was pilloried just like Phil Collins and Geri Halliwell before him". However, he later denied this claim of a political allegiance to the Conservatives, saying, "The Tory thing is complete bulls--t! It came out of Matt's mouth in an interview taking the complete p--s, and it was on the front cover of a newspaper. He was like laughing when he said it. Matt's Labour! He said something like, 'Now I've got loads of money I'm a f--king Tory boy,' laughing."

Discography

Studio albums

Extended plays

Singles
As lead artist

As a featured artist

References

External links

 
1985 births
Living people
Busted (band) members
People from Woodbridge, Suffolk
Brit Award winners
English rock singers
English male singer-songwriters
English lyricists
English rock guitarists
English male guitarists
English multi-instrumentalists
Fightstar members
Island Records artists
Masked Singer winners
People educated at Framlingham College
PIAS Recordings artists